Sallie Robey Permar is the pediatrician-in-chief at NewYork-Presbyterian / Weill Cornell Medical Center and the chair of the Department of Pediatrics at Weill Cornell Medicine. Her research focuses on infections affecting newborns.

Education 
Permar graduated with a BS in biology from Davidson College in 1997. In 2004, she earned an MD from Harvard Medical School and a PhD in microbiology and immunology from Johns Hopkins Bloomberg School of Public Health. She then did a pediatrics residency and a fellowship in pediatric infectious diseases at Boston Children's Hospital.

Career 
In 2011, Permar joined the faculty at Duke University School of Medicine as an assistant professor of pediatrics. She was promoted to associate professor in 2013.

Permar was the Wilburt C. Davison Distinguished Professor of pediatrics, immunology, and molecular genetics at Duke University School of Medicine, associate dean of physician-scientist development; and founding director of the Duke Medical's Children's Health and Discovery Institute. She is also a member of the Duke Global Health Institute.

On December 1, 2020, Dr. Permar was appointed chair of the Department of Pediatrics at Weill Cornell Medicine and the pediatrician-in-chief at NewYork-Presbyterian/Weill Cornell Medical Center and New York-Presbyterian Komansky Children's Hospital.

Dr. Permar is an author of almost 150 scientific publications.

Awards 
 2012 New Innovator Award, National Institutes of Health
 2012 Presidential Early Career Award in Science and Engineering (awarded in 2013)
 2014 Young Investigator Award, Society for Pediatric Research
 2015 Young Investigator Award, Pediatric Infectious Diseases Society
 2020 E. Mead Johnson Award from the Society for Pediatric Research
 2020 Gale and Ira Drukier Prize in Children's Health Research from Weill Cornell Medicine

She was elected to the American Society for Clinical Investigation in 2016.

References 

Duke University School of Medicine faculty
Harvard Medical School alumni
Johns Hopkins Bloomberg School of Public Health alumni
American pediatricians
Women pediatricians
Year of birth missing (living people)
Living people
21st-century American physicians
21st-century American women physicians
Members of the American Society for Clinical Investigation